Kérastase is a French luxury hair and scalp care line that distributes products internationally. Kérastase is part of the L’Oréal Professional Products Division.

History 
Kérastase was founded in 1964 by scientists at L’Oreal Advanced Research.

Products 
Kérastase sells hair care and styling products at luxury salons, through their e-commerce site, and in Sephora.

See also
L'Oréal Professionnel

External links

L'Oréal brands
Cosmetics companies of France
Shampoo brands
pl:Kérastase